Randall Bacon is an American actor and former football player.

Bacon played high school football in Sacramento, California before attending college and playing for the Texas A&M University-Kingsville Javalinas. Following his football career, he transitioned to acting and has performed in TV and film including roles in series like All My Children, The Young and the Restless, Scream Queens, and Marvel's Agents of S.H.I.E.L.D. along with the film Rz-9.

Bacon works as a commercial body double for Seattle Seahawks quarterback Russell Wilson. He is part of "The Team That Never Plays" profiled in Sports Illustrated.

Filmography

Television

References

American male actors
Living people
Year of birth missing (living people)